Karori (کروڑی) is a Town and union council (an administrative subdivision) of Mansehra District in the Khyber Pakhtunkhwa Province of Pakistan. It is located in the west of the district and lies in an area affected by the 2005 Kashmir earthquake.

References 

PK-33 NA-14

Union councils of Mansehra District
Populated places in Mansehra District